Clink may refer to:

 The Clink, a historic prison in Southwark, England
 The Clink (restaurant), British restaurants employing prisoners for rehabilitation
 Prison, in general
 CLINK, an algorithm for hierarchical clustering
 Channel Link (C-Link), a high-speed data transmission interface
 A nickname for CenturyLink Field, in Seattle, Washington
 Clink is the English name for the Turkish dessert Kazandibi
 The sound "clink",  a form of onomatopoeia
 C-Link, the closing track of Sir Paul McCartney's 2018 album Egypt Station
 Clink (TV series), a television prison drama series on 5Star
 Clink (FBNYV), a virulence protein produced by the faba bean necrotic yellows virus